Pir Ahmad Kandi (also Romanized as Pīr Aḩmad Kandī) is a village in Avajiq-e Shomali Rural District, Dashtaki District, Chaldoran County, West Azerbaijan Province, Iran. At the 2006 census, its population was 200, in 38 families.

References 

Populated places in Chaldoran County